Santiago is both a Spanish and Portuguese surname. The surname Santiago was first found in Galicia, Spain. There are other forms that are shortened versions of Santiago: Sant, Santo, Sancto, Sancti, Sanct, Sanctis Santi. Also, these spellings apply to all the righteous men of the Calendar of the days of the Patron Saints.
Santiago is a habitational name from any of the numerous places named for the dedication of churches to St. James (Sant Iago).

People
 Adalberto Santiago, salsa singer
 Americo Santiago, American politician
 Benito Santiago (born 1965), Puerto Rican baseball catcher
 Benito Santiago Jr. (born 1989), son of the above; Puerto Rican basketball player
 Carlos E. Santiago, economist and educator; Chancellor of the University of Wisconsin-Milwaukee[307]
 Carlos Manuel Rodríguez Santiago, beatified by Pope John Paul II in 2001; first Puerto Rican and first Caribbean-born layperson to be beatified
 Charles Santiago, Malaysian politician
 Daniel Santiago, former NBA basketball player
 Eddie Santiago, salsa singer
 Eduardo Santiago Delpín, surgeon; wrote the first book in Spanish about organ transplants
 Elena Santiago (born 1941), Spanish writer
 Esmeralda Santiago, author
 Emile Santiago (1899-1995), American costume designer
 Ezequiel Santiago (1973–2019), American politician 
 Hector Santiago (born 1987), American baseball player
 Héctor Santiago-Colón, posthumously awarded the Medal of Honor 
 Herman Santiago, rock n roll singer; composed song "Why Do Fools Fall in Love"
 Hugo Santiago, film director
 Irene Santiago, peace negotiator from the Philippines
 Joey Santiago, guitarist of the Pixies and The Martinis
 Luis Santiago (1977–2005), Filipino TV director
 Manuela Santiago Collazo, Mayor of Vieques
Margaret Santiago (1931-2018), American museum registrar
 María Elena Santiago, widow of rock and roll pioneer Buddy Holly
 Marikit Santiago (born 1985), Filipina-Australian artist
 Marvin Santiago (1947-2004), Puerto Rican salsa music singer
 Miriam Defensor Santiago (1945-2016), Filipino politician
 Nellie R. Santiago (born 1843), New York state senator
 O. J. Santiago, NFL player
 Rafael Santiago Maria, a Brazilian footballer known as Santiago
 Ramón Santiago (born 1979), American baseball player and coach
 Randy Santiago, Filipino singer and actor
 Renoly Santiago, actor
 Richard Santiago, a Puerto Rican boxer
 Ruben Santiago-Hudson, actor and playwright
 Saundra Santiago, actress
 Sonia Santiago, a ballerina in Germany
 Tony Santiago, military historian
 Vidal Santiago Díaz, political activist; barber of Pedro Albizu Campos and uncle of the novelist Esmeralda Santiago 
 Zoraida Santiago, singer and composer
 Melvin Jose Santiago Aponte, integrated marketing expert working for Univision Hartford-Springfield, broadcast sales and production

Fictional characters
 Amy Santiago, a detective in Brooklyn's ninety-ninth precinct in the comedy Brooklyn Nine-Nine
 Bobby Santiago, a supporting character in The Loud House and main character in The Casagrandes
 Ronnie Anne Santiago, Bobby's sister in The Loud House and The Casagrandes
 Maria Santiago, Bobby and Ronnie Anne's mother in The Loud House and The Casagrandes
 Arturo Santiago, Bobby and Ronnie Anne's father in The Loud House and The Casagrandes
 Colonel Corazon Santiago, a faction leader in the PC strategy game Sid Meier's Alpha Centauri
Mila Santiago, a character in Belgian series Ghost Rockers
 President Luis Santiago, in the television series Babylon 5
 Omar Santiago, in the television series Harsh Realm
 Raphael Santiago, a vampire from Cassandra Clare's Mortal Instruments series, as well as The Bane Chronicles, by the same author
 William Santiago, a member of the United States Marine Corps who was murdered at the Guantanamo Bay Naval Base in the movie A Few Good Men
 Santiago, a character in Mike Resnick's novels Santiago: a Myth of the Far Future (1986), and The Return of Santiago (2003)
 Santiago, a character on the United States television show Friday Night Lights, set in Texas (based on Buzz Bissinger's book)
 Santiago, the main character of Paulo Coelho's novel The Alchemist
 Santiago, a character in the novel Chronicle of a Death Foretold by Gabriel García Márquez
 Santiago, the titular character of Ernest Hemingway's The Old Man and the Sea

See also
Santiago (disambiguation)
Santiago (name)

References

Portuguese-language surnames
Spanish-language surnames